José Eduardo Martínez Alcántara (born 31 January 1999) is a Peruvian chess player. He was awarded the title of Grandmaster by FIDE in 2018.

Chess career

Alcantara won the U-18 World Championship in 2017 before going on to represent Peru in the 2018 Chess Olympiad.

He won the Zonal Tournament of South America in Ecuador with 7.5 points out of 9, thus qualifying for the Chess World Cup 2019, where he was defeated by Dmitry Jakovenko in the first round.

In the 6th Arica Open in 2019 he tied 2nd-8th place with Nikita Petrov, Deivy Vera Siguenas, Renato R. Quintiliano Pinto, Cristobal Henriquez Villagra, Salvador Alonso, and Diego Saul Rod Flores Quillas.

References

External links
 
 
 
 
 

1999 births
Living people
Peruvian chess players
Chess grandmasters
Chess Olympiad competitors
20th-century Peruvian people
21st-century Peruvian people